Mario Aldo Volpe (1936 – 2013 ) was a Colombian artist who lived in Switzerland for more than forty years. His artistic work spanned half a century and included around 3,000 abstract works on paper, board and canvas, mostly acrylic, ink, enamel and oil paintings as well as crayon, pencil and coloured pencil drawings.

Volpe's work is marked by geometric and linear elements, organic shapes, lively colours and the extensive use of black. His most significant influences can be found in the New York School of painting of the fifties and sixties, his architecture studies, and his roots in Colombia's Caribbean.

Volpe's estate is managed by the “ART-Nachlassstiftung” in Bern, Switzerland.

Life 
Volpe was born in Barranquilla, Colombia, on October 19, 1936, as a son of Italian immigrants. As a 12-year-old he made his first trips to New York and Italy. After completing his school years in Barranquilla, he moved to the United States at the age of 19 to study English and prepare for college at the Wilbraham Academy (now Wilbraham and Monson Academy) in Massachusetts.

At the age of 20, Volpe made his first direct encounter with contemporary art, at the Venice Biennale in 1956. That year, he took up his studies in architecture at the Carnegie Institute of Technology (now Carnegie Mellon School of Architecture) in Pittsburgh. After completing his architecture diploma in 1961, a scholarship from the Carnegie Institute allowed him to spend a summer at the American Academy in Fontainebleau, France, where he started to experiment with abstract drawing and became acquainted with painters and sculptors.

Volpe was accepted into the Harvard University Graduate School of Design, where he completed a year of the Masters class in architecture. In 1962, however, he decided to leave Harvard in order to fully devote himself to painting. He enrolled in the Art Students League of New York where he attended free classes for two years.

In 1964, a travel scholarship from the Art Students League took him on a study trip through Europe (London, Copenhagen, Stockholm, Helsinki, St. Petersburg, Amsterdam, Brussels, Paris, Madrid and Sevilla). After a year in Rome, where he met his wife, Brigit Scherz, Volpe moved back to the United States, to take up a position as assistant professor in the Studio Arts Department of the University of Minnesota in Minneapolis.

After five years of teaching at the University of Minnesota, Volpe moved back to Europe in 1970. He spent a year living and working in Turin, Italy, and then moved to Bern, Switzerland, in 1972, where he married Brigit Scherz in 1973. Their two children, Martina and Philippe, were born in 1974 and 1975. Volpe lived and worked in Bern until his death on 21 August 2013, at the age of 76.

Work 
“If we look at the trajectory which Volpe has accomplished in the fifty years of artistic work, we will observe an absolutely logical and coherent development."

“His pictorial motifs stem from the fortunate meeting or collision of a temperament of Caribbean ancestry with the purism of a researcher trained at a New York art college who has absorbed the great lessons of European art.”

“The canvases and the drawings of Mario Volpe powerfully evoke a destiny where diverse influences have made their mark. Whether in black or in colour, they communicate a rigorous exuberance, a fantastical Latin imagination reined in with the lasso."

 1956 – 1961: Architectural drawings
 1961: First ink paintings on paper
 1962 – 1969: Abstract-expressionist oils on canvas, board and paper
 1967 – 1980: “Hard-edge” paintings, with predominantly geometrical emphasis
 1972 – 1974: Coloured pencil drawings on board
 1979 – 1980: Vertical drawings
 1980 – 1981: Posters and announcements
 1981 – 1993: Acrylic paintings on canvas, board and paper
 1993 – 1998: “T- Pictures”, combining a horizontal and a vertical format to form a “T” shape
 1996 – 2002: “Triptychs”, works featuring three interconnected sections
 2002 – 2008: Linear ornamental works
 2009 – 2013: Last works

Curriculum vitae 

 1936: Born in Barranquilla, Colombia
 1943 – 1954: Colegio Biffi La Salle, Barranquilla, Colombia
 1955: Wilbraham Academy, Wilbraham, Massachusetts, USA
 1956 – 1961: Diploma in architecture, Carnegie Institute of Technology, Pittsburgh, Pennsylvania, USA
 1961: Scholarship, American Academy at Fontainebleau, France
 1962: Graduate School of Design, Harvard University, Cambridge Massachusetts, USA
 1962 – 1964: Painting studies, class of Sidney Gross, The Art Students League of New York, USA
 1965: McDowell Scholarship for one year of studies in Europe (Rome, Italy)
 1965 – 1970: Teaching at the University of Minnesota, Studio Arts Department, Minneapolis, USA
 1971: One year's stay in Turin, Italy
 1972 – 2013: Life and work in Bern, Switzerland

Exhibitions 

Solo exhibitions:
 1966: Art Students League of New York, USA
 1968: University Gallery Minneapolis, Minnesota, USA; Minnetonka Art Center, Orono, Minnesota, USA; Morningside College, Sioux City, Iowa, USA
 1969: Rochester Art Center, Rochester, Minnesota, USA
 1970: Hamline University, St. Paul, Minnesota, USA; North Hennepin Jr. College, Minneapolis, Minnesota, USA
 1974: Galerie Bettina Katzenstein, Zurich, Switzerland
 1977: Galerie Art Shop, Basel, Switzerland
 1979: Berner Galerie, Bern, Switzerland
 1980: Loeb Galerie, Bern, Switzerland
 1981: Galerie Centrale, Hermance, Switzerland
 1982: Galerie Van Loo, Brussels; Galerie 42, Antwerpen, Belgium; Galleria Napoletana delle Arti, Naples, Italy; Musée Cantonal des Beaux-Arts, Lausanne
 1983: Galeria Amics, Alicante, Spain; Knoll International, Napoli, Italy; Centrum Galerie, Basel, Switzerland
 1984: Galleria Paesi Nuovi, Rome, Italy
 1985: Hannah Feldmann Galerie, Bern, Switzerland
 1986: Centrum Galerie, Basel, Switzerland; Salόn Cultural de Avianca, Barranquilla, Colombia
 1987: Galerie DeI Mese-Fischer, Meisterschwanden, Switzerland; Museo de Arte Moderno, Cartagena, Colombia
 1988: Galerie Susanne Kulli, Bern, Switzerland
 1989: Salon Parterre, Bern, Switzerland
 1991: Galeria Elida Lara, Barranquilla, Colombia; Galerie Susanne Kulli, Bern, Switzerland
 1994: Galerie Susanne Kulli, Bern, Switzerland
 1996: Galerie Susanne Kulli, Bern, Switzerland
 1998: Galeria de la Aduana, Barranquilla, Colombia
 1999: ATAG, Ernst and Young, Bern, Switzerland
 2003: Universidad deI Norte, Barranquilla, Colombia; Kunstreich AG, Bern, Switzerland
 2004: Galerie Wandelbar, Gstaad, Switzerland
 2009: Johannes Church, Bern, Switzerland
 2016-17: Zetcom AG, Bern, Switzerland
 2018: Galerie Reflector, Bern, Switzerland
 2020: Galleria Il Rivellino, Locarno, Switzerland
 2022: Galerie Reflector, Bern, Switzerland

In addition, Volpe participated in around 60 group exhibitions, including at the Art Students League in New York, Art Expo in New York, Art Basel, Expo 2000 in Hanover, and various shows in Colombia and Switzerland.

References

Bibliography 
 Mario Volpe, with contributions by Christian Campiche, Viana Conti, Alvaro Medina: Colour Black. Till Schaap Edition, Bern, 2014
 Deborah Cullen and Elvis Fuentes: Caribbean: Art at the Crossroads of the World. Yale University Press, November 2012
 Mario Volpe, with contributions by Oswaldo Benavides C., Viana Conti: Abstractions: Obras – Works – Werke 1962 – 2002. Mueller Marketing und Druck AG, Gstaad, 2003

External links 
 ART-Nachlassstiftung – Estate of Mario Volpe (in German)
 Galerie Reflector - Mario Volpe "Minneapolis"
 Colombian Embassy in Bern: Obituary (in Spanish)
 Swissinfo –  Colombian painters in Switzerland (in Spanish)
 ColArte – Virtual Library of Art in Colombia (in Spanish)

Colombian painters
Colombian male painters
Colombian expatriates in Switzerland
Abstract painters
1936 births
2013 deaths
University of Minnesota faculty
Harvard Graduate School of Design alumni